Too Blind to See It is the only album by American singer Kym Sims, released in 1992. It was produced by Steve "Silk" Hurley and includes the worldwide hit single "Too Blind to See It" which reached number 38 on the US Billboard Hot 100 and number five in the UK Singles Chart. Two further singles were released from the album: "Take My Advice" (UK No. 13) and "A Little Bit More" (UK No. 30).

Track listing

Personnel
Credits adapted from album liner notes.

Musicians
Kym Sims – primary artist, vocals, backing vocals (tracks 1–5, 7–11)
 Frost – rap (track 11)
Steve "Silk" Hurley – backing vocals (tracks 1–2 & 11), keyboards, drum programming
Donell Rush – guest artist, backing vocals (tracks 3–4, 6–8 & 10)
Chante Savage – guest artist, backing vocals (tracks 3–4, 6–8 & 10)

Production
All tracks produced, arranged and mixed by Steve "Silk" Hurley
Vocals produced and arranged by Steve "Silk" Hurley, Donell Rush & Chante Savage
Engineers: Larry Sturm, Eric Miller, Steve "Silk" Hurley
Executive producers: Frank Rodrigo, Steve "Silk" Hurley, Joey Carvello
Management: Frank Rodrigo
Recorded at Tanglewood Studios, Brookfield, Illinois
Art direction: Thomas Bricker
Photography: Cesar Vera
Stylist: Todd Hartnett
Hair and make up: Sam Fine

Charts

References

External links
Too Blind to See It at Discogs

1992 debut albums
Atco Records albums
Atlantic Records albums
Kym Sims albums